Daydreamin' is the fifth album by the Los Angeles, California-based R&B group Dynasty, released in 1986.

Track listing 
"Cherry Red Bikini", ´6:30 (Lathan Armor, Duncan Payne)
"Way Out", 5:59 (Kevin Spencer, William Shelby)
"Freeway lover", 5:27 (William Shelby, Bo Watson) 
"Everlasting", 4:43 (William Shelby, Norman Beavers)
"Personality", 4:42 (Kenneth Edmonds, Antonio Reid, Dwayne Ladd)
"Daydreamin'", 4:49 (Kevin Spencer, William Shelby)
"Tuff Love", 5:31 (Nidra Sylvers, Rickey Smith, William Shelby)
"Lock on Love"; 4:27 (William Shelby, Steve Shockley, Leon Sylvers III)

References 

1986 albums
Dynasty (band) albums
SOLAR Records albums
Albums produced by Leon Sylvers III